Artur Kats (born 21 May 1991) is a Belarusian professional footballer who plays for Naftan Novopolotsk.

References

External links 
 
 

1994 births
Living people
Belarusian footballers
Association football defenders
FC BATE Borisov players
FC Gorodeya players
FC Smolevichi players
FC Luch Minsk (2012) players
FC Dnyapro Mogilev players
FC Vitebsk players
FC Belshina Bobruisk players
FC Naftan Novopolotsk players